Dash Bolagh (also Romanized as Dāsh Bolāgh and Dāshbolāgh; also known as Dash Bulag, Dāshbūlāgh, and Dāshbulāq) is a village in Qareh Poshtelu-e Pain Rural District, Qareh Poshtelu District, Zanjan County, Zanjan Province, Iran. At the 2006 census, its population was 103, in 24 families.

References 

Populated places in Zanjan County